George McClellan (Mac) Stearns (17 December 1901 – 9 January 1979) was a Progressive Conservative party member of the House of Commons of Canada. He was an industrialist by career, starting up and running the Mégantic Pulp & Paper Company.

Stearns was born in the small rural town of Lac-Mégantic, Quebec. He and his wife had three children together, to whom he passed down his successful Mégantic-area Pulp & Paper company after he died. After an unsuccessful attempt to win the Compton—Frontenac riding in the 1957 federal election, he was elected in the 1958 election. He served one term, the 24th Canadian Parliament, before leaving federal office and did not campaign for re-election in 1962. 

In 1979, he died aged 77 in Lac Megantic.

References

External links
 

1901 births
1979 deaths
Members of the House of Commons of Canada from Quebec
Progressive Conservative Party of Canada MPs
People from Lac-Mégantic, Quebec